John Warren Gardiner (December 22, 1922 – April 1, 2015) was a Canadian football player who played for the Winnipeg Blue Bombers. He first played college football at the University of Minnesota before enlisting in the United States Army during World War II. He then enrolled at Purdue University and later transferred to Montana State University.

References

1922 births
2015 deaths
American football quarterbacks
Canadian football quarterbacks
American players of Canadian football
Minnesota Golden Gophers football players
Purdue Boilermakers football players
Montana State Bobcats football players
Winnipeg Blue Bombers players
Players of American football from Minneapolis
Sportspeople from Minneapolis
United States Army soldiers
United States Army personnel of World War II
Players of Canadian football from Minnesota